Burlesque: Original Motion Picture Soundtrack is the soundtrack album to the film of the same name, released by Screen Gems, Inc and RCA Records on November 19, 2010. The soundtrack consists of ten songs sung by the film's stars, American singers Christina Aguilera and Cher; Aguilera sang eight of the tracks, while Cher performed the remaining two. The album is inspired by jazz music style, in style with Aguilera's fifth studio album Back to Basics (2006), but contrasting to her then-recent release Bionic (2010), which was recorded concurrently with Burlesque. Burlesque served as Cher's first album since the release of Living Proof nine years earlier.

Upon its release, the album received generally favorable reviews from music critics. Cher's song "You Haven't Seen the Last of Me" won a Golden Globe Award for Best Original Song at the 2011 ceremony, and received another nomination in the same category for Aguilera's "Bound to You". The album also received a nomination at the 54th Annual Grammy Awards, for Best Compilation Soundtrack for Visual Media. Commercially, the album was moderately successful, peaking at number eighteen on the U.S. Billboard 200 chart and in the top ten in several other countries. As of August 2019, the album has sold 779,000 copies in the United States. The soundtrack spawned three promotional singles: "Express" and "Show Me How You Burlesque" by Aguilera, and "You Haven't Seen the Last of Me" by Cher.

Background 
In early May 2010, Aguilera announced that she would embark on the supporting concert tour for her sixth studio album, Bionic. However, her management team announced shortly afterwards that the tour was postponed due to Aguilera's promotion for her first feature film, Burlesque (2010), in which she starred alongside Cher. Aguilera reported that she would reschedule the tour in 2011, though the tour never happened.

Burlesque was released in November 2010. The film was met with mixed reviews from critics, who criticized it for being "campy and clichéd", yet praised Aguilera's acting debut. The accompanying soundtrack, Burlesque: Original Motion Picture Soundtrack, comprises ten songs: eight performed by Aguilera and two performed by Cher. It was Cher's first major release since her compilation Gold in 2005. Producer Tricky Stewart stated that the collaboration with Aguilera on Burlesque soundtrack was "a crazy opportunity different from anything [he]'ve ever done before". Danja was looking forward to working with Aguilera on the soundtrack, however it was not done.

"Nasty" 

During the recording process, Aguilera recorded a song titled "Nasty", which featured guest vocals from CeeLo Green. However, the track was ultimately scrapped due to legal issues concerning sample clearance. The song was passed to multiple other artists, including British singer Pixie Lott. Lott was able to clear the samples, and eventually released the song as the lead single from her self-titled third studio album in 2014. Aguilera's recording was eventually leaked online, and received positive reviews.

Composition 

Burlesque: Original Motion Picture Soundtrack comprises ten songs: eight performed by Aguilera and two performed by Cher. The soundtrack has a "brassy, jazzy" sound inspired by jazz, in contrast to Aguilera's last electronic music-inspired studio album Bionic (2010) but similar to her fifth 1920s, 1930s and 1940s-influenced studio album Back to Basics (2006). Four of the songs performed by Aguilera are cover versions, two of Etta James' works: "Something's Got a Hold on Me" and "Tough Lover", a cover version of Mae West's "Guy What Takes His Time", and a dance version of "The Beautiful People" by Marilyn Manson, including the "unmistakable" drum beats and guitar riff in the original version. "I Am a Good Girl" "sticks to the sassy swing of a bygone musical era", while "Express" has a similar musical style to Aguilera's previous single "Lady Marmalade" and lyrically evokes sexual theme as Aguilera "seductively" sings, "Show a little leg / You gotta shimmy your chest". The uptempo number "Show Me How You Burlesque" has a "modern sounding" dance production, but "lack of melody and strong hooks". The power ballad "Bound to You", co-written by Sia, has the same musical style to "You Lost Me" from Bionic, which was also written by Sia and features Aguilera's strong vocal delivery.

The two songs performed by Cher are: "Welcome to Burlesque" and "You Haven't Seen the Last of Me". "Welcome to Burlesque" was described as "a 'Cabaret'-style oompah that shows both skill and humor". The power ballad "You Haven't Seen the Last of Me" features Cher's powerful vocals.

Promotion 
In August 2010, a video containing a scene from the film featuring Aguilera performing "Something's Got a Hold on Me" was released onto YouTube. Later in early November, a clip featuring Aguilera performing "But I Am a Good Girl" from the movie was also released. On November 17, 2010, Aguilera performed the track "Bound to You" on The Tonight Show with Jay Leno. On November 19, 2010, she performed "Something's Got a Hold on Me" on The Ellen DeGeneres Show. Aguilera performed "Express" at the American Music Awards of 2010 on November 21, 2010. The following day, Aguilera performed "Something's Got a Hold on Me" on Conan. On November 23, 2010, Aguilera performed "Show Me How You Burlesque" and "Beautiful" during the season finale of the eleventh season of U.S. television dancing competition Dancing with the Stars.

"You Haven't Seen the Last of Me" performed by Cher was the first song to be released from Burlesque. On November 24, 2010, a digital remix extended play of "You Haven't Seen the Last of Me" was released via iTunes Stores worldwide. On December 7, the digital remix version of the song was purchased for sales onto iTunes Stores. In the United States, the single impacted adult contemporary radio stations on January 15, 2011. "Express" and "Show Me How You Burlesque" performed by Aguilera were the two next singles from the soundtrack, respectively: "Express" impacted Australian contemporary hit radio stations on December 6, 2010, while "Show Me How You Burlesque" was made available for digital sales on February 4, 2011.

Critical reception 

Stephen Thomas Erlewine from AllMusic gave the soundtrack three out of five stars, commenting that "some of this stuff is quite good". Slant Magazine's Eric Henderson provided a mixed review, writing that the soundtrack "seems to indicate her efforts are coming from a similarly era-straddling psychological place". Jim Farber from New York Daily News criticized Aguilera for her "vocals offer the same distracting loop-de-loops and showy tics", but complimented Cher that she "balances both aspects ideally". A reviewer from Blogcritics labelled the album a "grab bag of tracks that don't really add up to cohesive album". Leah Greanblatt from Entertainment Weekly gave the album a "B" score, naming it a "shamelessly diva-fied mix of balladry, Broadway cabaret, and backroom boogie-woogie" and complimented on its musical departure from Aguilera's previous studio album Bionic. In a positive review, Billboard editor Kerri Mason praised Burlesque as "a campy celebration of diva-dom and an over-the-top, triple-threat performance". James Wigney of The Advertiser praised Aguilera's "vocal gymnastics", but was mixed towards Cher's numbers on the soundtrack.

Commercial performance 
On the US Billboard 200, Burlesque debuted and peaked at number eighteen during the week of November 28, 2010, selling 63,000 copies in its first week. It was certified Gold by the Recording Industry Association of America, having sold 779,000 copies in the US as of September 2014. On the Australian ARIA Albums Chart, the soundtrack peaked at number two and is her second highest-charting album after Back to Basics (2006). It was certified Platinum by the Australian Recording Industry Association in 2015 for selling over 70,000 copies. Burlesque peaked at number 16 on the Canadian Albums Chart and was certified gold by the Music Canada for shipments of 40,000 units in the region. The soundtrack also gained commercial success on several record charts: peaking at number five in Austria and New Zealand, and number eight in Switzerland.

Track listing 
All songs performed by Christina Aguilera except where noted.

Personnel 
Credits adapted from AllMusic.

 Christina Aguilera – vocal arrangement, vocal producer
 Cher – vocals
 Jess Collins – background vocals
 Gene Cipriano – tenor saxophone
 Lauren Chipman – viola
 Daphne Chen – violin
 Andrew Chavez – Pro-Tools
 Chris Chaney – bass
 Alejandro Carballo – trombone
 Frank Capp – castanets
 Jebin Bruni – piano
 Richard Brown – Pro-Tools
 Eddie Brown – piano
 Felix Bloxsom – drums
 Stevie Blacke – cello, viola, violin
 Charlie Bisharat – violin
 Robert Bacon – guitar
 Spring Aspers – executive in charge of music
 Keith Armstrong – mixing assistant
 Alex Arias – assistant, engineer, Pro-Tools
 Steven Antin – executive soundtrack producer
 Alex Al – acoustic bass
 Thomas Aiezza – assistant engineer
 Andrew Wuepper – engineer, horn engineer, percussion engineer
 Ben Wendell – saxophone
 Roy Weigand – trumpet
 Eric Weaver – assistant
 Ian Walker – contrabass
 Lia Vollack – executive in charge of music
 Gabe Veltri – engineer
 Rich King vocal producer
 Stephen Vaughan – photography
 Doug Trantow – engineer, Pro-Tools
 Brad Townsend – mixing
 Pat Thrall – engineer
 Brian "B-Luv" Thomas – engineer, horn engineer, percussion engineer
 Chris Tedesco – contracting
 Mark Taylor – vocal producer
 C. "Tricky" Stewart – producer, vocal producer
 Eric Spring – engineer
 Josh Freese – drums
 Ron Fair – arranger, producer, vocal arrangement, vocal producer
 Peter Erskine – drums
 Ron Dziubla – baritone sax
 George Doering – guitar
 Richard Dodd – cello
 Mark Dobson – engineer
 Samuel Dixon – percussion, producer, programming
 Buck Damon – music supervisor
 Jim Cox – horn arrangements, piano
 Pablo Correa – percussion
 Arturo Solar – trumpet
 Joel Shearer – guitar
 Gus Seyffert – acoustic bass, electric bass, baritone guitar
 Matt Serletic – arranger, keyboards, producer, programming
 The Section Quartet – strings
 Andrew Schubert – mixing
 John Salvatore Scaglione – guitar
 Oscar Ramirez – engineer, vocal engineer
 Christian Plata – assistant
 Phantom Boyz – arranger, keyboards, producer, programming
 Linda Perry – engineer, producer
 Gordon Peeke – drums, percussion
 Paul III – acoustic bass
 Ray Parker Jr. – guitar
 Mimi Parker – assistant
 'Lil' Tal Ozz – assistant
 Geoff Nudell – clarinet
 Michael Neuble – drums
 Luis Navarro – assistant
 Jamie Muhoberac – keyboards
 Dean Mora – horn arrangements, transcription
 Peter Mokran – mixing
 Jim McMillen – trombone
 Andy Martin – trombone
 Manny Marroquin – mixing
 Chris Lord-Alge – mixing
 Steve Lindsey – producer
 Mike Leisz – assistant
 Juan Manuel Leguizamón – percussion
 Greg Kurstin – piano
 Oliver Kraus – string arrangements, string engineer, strings
 James King – saxophone
 Claude Kelly – vocal producer
 Rick Keller – alto sax
 Nik Karpen – mixing assistant
 Alan Kaplan – trumpet
 Jaycen Joshua – mixing
 Graham Hope – assistant
 Mark Hollingsworth – tenor sax
 Dan Higgins – clarinet, baritone sax
 Tal Herzberg – engineer, Pro-Tools
 Trey Henry – bass
 Erwin Gorostiza – art direction, design
 Eric Gorfain – string arrangements, violin
 Matthew Gerrard – producer
 Jesus Garnica – assistant
 Brian Gardner – mastering
 Chris Galland – assistant
 James Gadson – drums

Charts

Weekly charts

Year-end charts

Certifications and sales

Release history 

Notes
 denotes vocal producer

References

External links 
Videos of song performances from the film on YouTube:
 

2010 soundtrack albums
Cher albums
Christina Aguilera albums
RCA Records soundtracks
Albums produced by Samuel Dixon
Albums produced by Mark Taylor (music producer)
Musical film soundtracks